The Second Prophet of Amun (hm netjer sen-nu en Amun), also called the Second Priest of Amun, was a high ranking priestly official in the cult of the ancient Egyptian god Amun. The Second Prophet of Amun office was created in the New Kingdom, at the beginning of the Eighteenth Dynasty.

History

New Kingdom

The office of second prophet of Amun was created in the beginning of the 18th Dynasty during the reign of Ahmose I. A donation stela from Karnak records how king Ahmose purchased the office of Second Prophet of Amun and endowed the position with land, goods and administrators. The position of Second Prophet of Amun was put under the authority of the God's Wife of Amun at its creation. 
Made in the presence of the [...officials...] of the territory of Thebes and the temple priesthood of Amun. What was said m hm n stp-si l.p.h. on this day, [saying]: "The office of Second Priest of Amun [shall] belong to the God's Wife, Great Royal Wife, united with the white crown, Ahmose-Nefertari, living; having been made for her in an imyt-pr, from son to son, heir to heir, [without allowing] it [to be interfered by anybody forever and ever.
The endowment was given to Queen Ahmose-Nefertari and her descendants. The record was signed and later confirmed by an oracle. Records from a later era indicate that in this position she would have been responsible for all temple properties, administration of estates, workshops, treasuries and all the associated administration staff.

During the reign of Hatshepsut and Tuthmosis III, the Second Prophet was involved in royal constructions at Karnak. The Second Prophet Puimre oversaw the erection of an ebony shrine dedicated to Hatshepsut, the construction of two obelisks for Tuthmosis II and the construction of doors made of Tura limestone. In Puimre's tomb it is shown that he additionally was in charge of receiving goods from oases and tribute from  Nubia, including captives.

Third Intermediate Period
Under the High Priests of Amun Piankh and Pinedjem I in the Twenty-first Dynasty of Egypt the position of Second Prophet was taken up by relatives of the High Priests. From the time of Menkheperre on the positions of 2nd, 3rd and 4th Prophet of Amun were not taken up by the family of the High Priest of Amun. The positions were given to local Theban nobles, who would often marry into the family of the High Priest.

During the Twenty-fifth Dynasty of Egypt the Nubian rulers broke the hold of the local families on these priestly positions. Shabaqo appointed Kelbasken as 4th prophet and later his son Haremakhet as High Priest of Amun. Taharqa appointed his son Nesishutefnut as Second Prophet of Amun.

Notable Second Prophets of Amun

References

Amun

Priests of the Eighteenth Dynasty of Egypt
People of the Nineteenth Dynasty of Egypt
People of the Twentieth Dynasty of Egypt
Ancient Egyptian titles
Ancient Egypt-related lists
Amun